Zbigniew Zarzycki (born 12 March 1948) is a Polish former volleyball player and coach, a member of the Poland national team from 1968 to 1976. He won a gold medal at the Olympic Games Montreal 1976 and the 1974 World Championship.

Honours

As a player
 CEV European Champions Cup
  1977/1978 – with Płomień Milowice
 National championships
 1976/1977  Polish Championship, with Płomień Milowice
 1978/1979  Polish Championship, with Płomień Milowice

References

External links
 
 
 Player profile at Volleybox.net

1948 births
Living people
People from Lębork
Polish men's volleyball players
Polish volleyball coaches
Olympic volleyball players of Poland
Volleyball players at the 1968 Summer Olympics
Volleyball players at the 1972 Summer Olympics
Volleyball players at the 1976 Summer Olympics
Medalists at the 1976 Summer Olympics
Olympic gold medalists for Poland
Olympic medalists in volleyball
Skra Bełchatów coaches